Adanac (Canada spelled in reverse) is a small farming hamlet in Round Valley No. 410, Saskatchewan, Canada. The hamlet is located at the intersection of Highway 14 and Range road 221, approximately 5 km east of the Town of Unity.

See also

 St. Joseph's Colony, Saskatchewan
 List of communities in Saskatchewan
 Hamlets of Saskatchewan
 List of geographic names derived from anagrams and ananyms

References

Former villages in Saskatchewan
Round Valley No. 410, Saskatchewan
Unincorporated communities in Saskatchewan
Division No. 13, Saskatchewan